The year 1970 in film involved some significant events.


Highest-grossing films (U.S.)

The top ten 1970 released films by box office gross in North America are as follows:

Events
 January 9 – Larry Fine, the second member of The Three Stooges, suffers a massive stroke, effectively ending his career.
 February 11 – The Magic Christian, starring Peter Sellers and Ringo Starr, premieres in New York City. The film's soundtrack album, including Badfinger's "Come and Get It" (written and produced by Paul McCartney), is released on Apple Records.
 March 12 – Film debut of Ornella Muti in La moglie più bella (The Most Beautiful Wife) 3 days after her 15th birthday.
 March 17 – The controversial film The Boys in the Band, directed by William Friedkin and based on Mart Crowley's hit off-Broadway play, opens in theaters.
 October 24 – Joan Crawford's final film, the low-budget horror picture Trog, opens in theaters.
 December 1 – Yousuf Khan Sher Bano is the first Pashto film released.
 December 14 – John Lennon and Yoko Ono film Up Your Legs Forever with 367 participants in New York City.
 The IMAX motion picture projection system premieres at the Fuji Pavilion, at Expo '70 in Osaka, Japan.
 In Culver City, California, MGM begins selling off its studio back lot property and movie props.

Awards

Cannes Film Festival (Palme d'Or):
M*A*S*H, directed by Robert Altman, United States

Notable films released in 1970
United States unless stated

#
7 Plus Seven, a TV documentary directed by Michael Apted - (U.K.)

A
The Act of the Heart, starring Geneviève Bujold and Donald Sutherland - (Canada)
The Adventurers, starring Candice Bergen, Bekim Fehmiu, Olivia de Havilland, Ernest Borgnine
The Adventures of Gerard, starring Peter McEnery, Claudia Cardinale, Eli Wallach, Jack Hawkins
Airport, directed by George Seaton, starring Burt Lancaster, Dean Martin, Jean Seberg, Jacqueline Bisset, Van Heflin, George Kennedy, Helen Hayes, Maureen Stapleton, Barry Nelson
Alex in Wonderland, directed by Paul Mazursky, starring Donald Sutherland
The American Soldier (Der amerikanische Soldat), directed by Rainer Werner Fassbinder - (West Germany)
And Soon the Darkness, starring Pamela Franklin - (U.K.)
Ann and Eve, starring Gio Petré, Marie Liljedahl and Francisco Rabal
The Angel Levine, starring Zero Mostel and Harry Belafonte
The Aristocats - an animated Disney film. Directed by Wolfgang Reitherman, starring Phil Harris, Eva Gabor, Hermione Baddeley, Gary Dubin, Dean Clark, Sterling Holloway, Roddy Maude-Roxby, and Liz English
Awakening of the Beast (O Ritual dos Sádicos) - (Brazil)

B
The Baby Maker, starring Barbara Hershey and Sam Groom
The Ballad of Cable Hogue, directed by Sam Peckinpah, starring Jason Robards and Stella Stevens
Bartleby, starring Paul Scofield – (U.K.)
The Bear and the Doll (L'ours et la poupée), starring Brigitte Bardot and Jean-Pierre Cassel - (France)
Bed and Board (Domicile Conjugal), directed by François Truffaut, starring Jean-Pierre Léaud - (France)
Behold Homolka (Ecce homo Homolka) - (Czechoslovakia)
The Beloved, starring Raquel Welch - (U.K.)
Beneath the Planet of the Apes, starring James Franciscus, Kim Hunter, Maurice Evans
Beyond the Valley of the Dolls, directed by Russ Meyer, starring Dolly Read
The Bird with the Crystal Plumage (L'uccello dalle piume di cristallo), directed by Dario Argento - (Italy)
Black Brigade, starring Stephen Boyd and Richard Pryor
Bloody Mama, directed by Roger Corman, starring Shelley Winters, Pat Hingle, Don Stroud, Robert De Niro
The Boatniks, starring Robert Morse, Stefanie Powers and Phil Silvers
The Body, a documentary narrated by Frank Finlay and Vanessa Redgrave - (U.K.)
Borsalino, starring Jean-Paul Belmondo and Alain Delon - (France)
El bosque del lobo (a.k.a. The Ancines Woods) - (Spain)
The Boys in the Band, directed by William Friedkin
Brancaleone at the Crusades (Brancaleone alle Crociate), starring Vittorio Gassman and Adolfo Celi - (Italy)
The Breach, directed by Claude Chabrol - (France/Italy/Belgium)
Brewster McCloud, directed by Robert Altman, starring Bud Cort, Sally Kellerman, Michael Murphy, Shelley Duvall
The Brotherhood of the Bell, starring  Glenn Ford, Rosemary Forsyth and Maurice Evans
The Butcher (Le Boucher), directed by Claude Chabrol, starring Stéphane Audran and Jean Yanne - (France)

C
Cannon for Cordoba, starring George Peppard
Carry On Up the Jungle, starring Sid James, Kenneth Connor, Frankie Howerd - (U.K.)
Case for a Rookie Hangman
Catch-22, directed by Mike Nichols, starring Alan Arkin, Jon Voight, Richard Benjamin, Bob Newhart, Charles Grodin, Orson Welles, Art Garfunkel
C.C. and Company, starring Joe Namath, Ann-Margret and William Smith
Le Cercle Rouge (The Red Circle), directed by Jean-Pierre Melville, starring Alain Delon, Bourvil, Yves Montand, Gian Maria Volonté - (France)
Chariots of the Gods (Erinnerungen an die Zukunft), documentary - (West Germany)
The Cheyenne Social Club, directed by Gene Kelly, starring James Stewart and Henry Fonda
Chisum, starring John Wayne, Ben Johnson, Forrest Tucker, Christopher George, Glenn Corbett
Claire's Knee (Le genou de Claire), directed by Éric Rohmer - (France)
Cockeyed Cowboys of Calico County, starring Dan Blocker and Nanette Fabray
Colossus: The Forbin Project, starring Eric Braeden and Susan Clark
Compañeros, starring Franco Nero and Jack Palance - (Italy)
The Confession (L'Aveu), directed by Costa-Gavras, starring Yves Montand and Simone Signoret - (France/Italy)
The Conformist (Il conformista), directed by Bernardo Bertolucci, starring Jean-Louis Trintignant and Stefania Sandrelli - (Italy/France)
Connecting Rooms, starring Bette Davis and Michael Redgrave - (U.K.)
Cotton Comes to Harlem, starring Godfrey Cambridge, Raymond St. Jacques, Calvin Lockhart, Redd Foxx
Count Dracula, starring  Christopher Lee, Klaus Kinski and  Herbert Lom- (Italy)
Country Dance, starring Peter O'Toole
Crescendo, starring Stefanie Powers
Crime and Punishment (Prestuplenie i nakazanie) - (U.S.S.R.)
Crimes of the Future, directed by David Cronenberg - (Canada)
Cromwell, directed by Ken Hughes, starring Richard Harris and Alec Guinness - (U.K.)
The Cross and the Switchblade, starring Pat Boone and Erik Estrada

D
Darker than Amber, starring Rod Taylor and Jane Russell
Darling Lili, directed by Blake Edwards, starring Julie Andrews and Rock Hudson
Days and Nights in the Forest (Aranyer Din Ratri), directed by Satyajit Ray - (India)
Deep End, directed by Jerzy Skolimowski, starring Jane Asher - (U.K./West Germany)
The Delta Factor, starring Yvette Mimieux and Christopher George
The Demise of Father Mouret, directed by Georges Franju - (France)
Diary of a Mad Housewife, directed by Frank Perry, starring Carrie Snodgress (Golden Globe winner), Richard Benjamin, Frank Langella
Dionysus in '69, directed by Brian De Palma
Dirty Dingus Magee, starring Frank Sinatra
Dodes'ka-den, directed by Akira Kurosawa - (Japan)
The Dunwich Horror, starring Dean Stockwell and Sandra Dee

E
Eden and After (L'Eden et après / Eden a potom), directed by Alain Robbe-Grillet - (France/Czechoslovakia)
El Condor, starring Jim Brown and Lee Van Cleef
El Topo (The Mole) - (Mexico)
Elise, or Real Life (Élise ou la vraie vie) - (France)
End of the Road, starring Stacy Keach, Harris Yulin, James Earl Jones
Entertaining Mr Sloane, starring Beryl Reid and Harry Andrews - (U.K.)
Equinox, starring Frank Bonner
Eugenie… The Story of Her Journey into Perversion, starring Marie Liljedahl, Maria Rohm and Christopher Lee - (Spain)
Even Dwarfs Started Small (Auch Zwerge haben klein angefangen), directed by Werner Herzog - (West Germany)

F
Figures in a Landscape, directed by Joseph Losey, starring Robert Shaw - (U.K.)
Five Easy Pieces, directed by Bob Rafelson, starring Jack Nicholson, Susan Anspach and Karen Black
The Flight (Beg) - (U.S.S.R.)
Four Murders Are Enough, Darling (Čtyři vraždy stačí, drahoušku) - (Czechoslovakia)
Fragment of Fear, starring David Hemmings and Gayle Hunnicutt - (U.K.)
Fruit of Paradise (Ovoce stromů rajských jíme) - (Czechoslovakia)

G
Gamera vs. Jiger - (Japan)
The Games, directed by Michael Winner, starring Michael Crawford, Ryan O'Neal, Charles Aznavour - (U.K.)
The Garden of the Finzi-Continis, directed by Vittorio De Sica - Academy Award for Best Foreign Language Film 1971 and Golden Bear winner - (Italy)
Getting Straight, starring Elliott Gould and Candice Bergen
Gimme Shelter, a documentary featuring The Rolling Stones
Gods of the Plague (Götter der Pest), directed by Rainer Werner Fassbinder - (West Germany)
Goodbye Gemini, starring Judy Geeson, Martin Potter, Michael Redgrave and Alexis Kanner- (U.K.)
Goin' Down the Road - (Canada)
The Great White Hope (film), directed by Martin Ritt, starring James Earl Jones and Jane Alexander
The Green Wall (La muralla verde) - (Peru)

H
Halls of Anger , starring Calvin Lockhart and Jeff Bridges
The Hawaiians, starring Charlton Heston
Hello-Goodbye, starring Michael Crawford
Hercules in New York, starring Arnold Schwarzenegger
Hi, Mom!, directed by Brian De Palma, starring Robert De Niro
History of Postwar Japan as Told by a Bar Hostess (Nippon Sengoshi – ), directed by Shohei Imamura - (Japan)
Hoffman, starring Peter Sellers and Sinéad Cusack - (U.K.)
The Honeymoon Killers, starring Shirley Stoler and Tony Lo Bianco
Hornets’ Nest, starring Rock Hudson
The Horror of Frankenstein, starring Ralph Bates, Kate O'Mara and Veronica Carlson- (U.K.)
Horton Hears a Who!, TV animated film
House of Dark Shadows, directed by Dan Curtis, starring Jonathan Frid and Grayson Hall
How Do I Love Thee?, starring Jackie Gleason and Maureen O'Hara
Husbands, directed by and starring John Cassavetes, with Ben Gazzara and Peter Falk

I
I Love My Wife, directed by Mel Stuart, starring Elliott Gould, Brenda Vaccaro, Angel Tompkins
I Never Sang for My Father, directed by Gilbert Cates, starring Gene Hackman, Estelle Parsons, Melvyn Douglas
The Intruders, starring Don Murray, John Saxon and  Anne Francis
Investigation of a Citizen Above Suspicion, directed by Elio Petri, starring Gian Maria Volonté - Academy Award for Best Foreign Language Film 1970 - (Italy)
The Invincible Six, directed by Jean Negulesco, starring Stuart Whitman and Elke Sommer
I Walk the Line, directed by John Frankenheimer, starring Gregory Peck and Tuesday Weld

J
El jardín de las delicias (The Garden of Delights), directed by Carlos Saura - (Spain)
Jenny, starring Marlo Thomas and Alan Alda
Joe, directed by John G. Avildsen, starring Peter Boyle and Susan Sarandon
Julius Caesar, directed by Stuart Burge, starring Charlton Heston, Jason Robards, John Gielgud - (U.K.)

K
Kati Patang, starring Rajesh Khanna - (India)
Kazoku - (Japan)
Kelly's Heroes, starring Clint Eastwood, Telly Savalas, Carroll O'Connor, Donald Sutherland, Don Rickles
Khilona (Toy) - (India)
King: A Filmed Record... Montgomery to Memphis, a documentary about Martin Luther King Jr., directed by Sidney Lumet
The Kremlin Letter, directed by John Huston, starring Patrick O'Neal, Barbara Parkins, Bibi Andersson, Nigel Green, Orson Welles

L
The Landlord, directed by Hal Ashby, starring Beau Bridges, Lee Grant, Diana Sands, Pearl Bailey, Louis Gossett Jr.
Landscape After the Battle (Krajobraz po bitwie), directed by Andrzej Wajda - (Poland)
The Last Grenade, directed by Gordon Flemyng, starring Stanley Baker, Honor Blackman, Richard Attenborough, Alex Cord
Last of the Mobile Hot Shots, starring James Coburn
The Last Warrior, aka Flap, starring Anthony Quinn, Shelley Winters, Tony Bill
Leo the Last, directed by John Boorman, starring Marcello Mastroianni and Billie Whitelaw - (U.K.)
Let It Be - documentary film directed by Michael Lindsay-Hogg and featuring The Beatles - (U.K.)
The Liberation of L.B. Jones, directed by William Wyler, starring Roscoe Lee Browne, Anthony Zerbe, Lee J. Cobb, Lola Falana, Barbara Hershey
Little Big Man, directed by Arthur Penn, starring Dustin Hoffman, Faye Dunaway, Chief Dan George
Little Fauss and Big Halsy, starring Robert Redford and Michael J. Pollard
The Little Theatre of Jean Renoir, a TV film - (France/Italy/West Germany)
Loot, directed by Silvio Narizzano, starring Richard Attenborough, Lee Remick, Hywel Bennett - (U.K.)
Lost in the Desert (a.k.a. Dirkie), directed by Jamie Uys - (South Africa)
Love Story, directed by Arthur Hiller, starring Ali MacGraw and Ryan O'Neal - winner of 5 Golden Globes including best picture and best director
Lovers and Other Strangers, starring Cloris Leachman, Beatrice Arthur, Richard Castellano, Diane Keaton
Loving, starring George Segal and Eva Marie Saint

M
M*A*S*H, directed by Robert Altman, starring Donald Sutherland, Elliott Gould, Tom Skerritt, Robert Duvall, Michael Murphy, Sally Kellerman, Rene Auberjonois, Jo Ann Pflug
Macho Callahan, starring Jean Seberg, David Janssen, Lee J. Cobb
Maidstone, written, directed by and starring Norman Mailer
A Man Called Horse, starring Richard Harris
The Man Who Haunted Himself, starring  Roger Moore, Anton Rodgers and Hildegarde Neil - (U.K.)
Metello - (Italy)
Michael the Brave (Mihai Viteazul) - (Romania)
The Molly Maguires, directed by Martin Ritt, starring Sean Connery and Richard Harris
Monte Walsh, starring Lee Marvin, Jack Palance, Jeanne Moreau
The Moonshine War, starring Alan Alda, Richard Widmark, Patrick McGoohan
Move, starring Paula Prentiss and Elliott Gould
The Music Lovers, directed by Ken Russell, starring Richard Chamberlain and Glenda Jackson - (U.K.)
Mumsy, Nanny, Sonny and Girly, starring Michael Bryant, Ursula Howells, Pat Heywood and Vanessa Howard- (U.K.)
Myra Breckinridge, starring Raquel Welch, Mae West, John Huston, Farrah Fawcett, Rex Reed
My Husband's Wife, starring Salah Zulfikar, Naglaa Fathi and Nelly - (Egypt)

N
The Nameless Knight - (Turkey)
Ned Kelly, starring Mick Jagger - (U.K.)
Norwood, starring Glen Campbell, Kim Darby, Joe Namath

O
o.k., directed by Michael Verhoeven - (West Germany)
Of Gods and the Undead (Os Deuses e os Mortos) - (Brazil)
On a Clear Day You Can See Forever, directed by Vincente Minnelli, starring Barbra Streisand and Yves Montand, songs by Alan Jay Lerner
One Day in the Life of Ivan Denisovich, starring Tom Courtenay - (U.K./Norway)
One More Time, directed by Jerry Lewis, starring Sammy Davis, Jr. and Peter Lawford
One Song a Day Takes Mischief Away (Tko pjeva zlo ne misli) - (Yugoslavia)
 On the Comet
The Out-of-Towners, directed by Arthur Hiller, starring Jack Lemmon and Sandy Dennis
The Over-the-Hill Gang Rides Again, starring Walter Brennan, Chill Wills, Fred Astaire
The Owl and the Pussycat, directed by Herbert Ross, starring Barbra Streisand and George Segal

P
The Palace of Angels (O Palácio dos Anjos) - (Brazil)
The Past-Master (Bash Maystorat), directed by Petar B. Vasilev, starring Kiril Gospodinov and Yuriy Yakovlev - (Bulgaria)
Patton, directed by Franklin J. Schaffner, starring George C. Scott - winner of 7 Academy Awards for 1971 including best picture, director and actor
Peace in the Fields (Paix sur les champs) - (Belgium)
Peau d'Âne (Donkey Skin), directed by Jacques Demy, starring Catherine Deneuve and Jean Marais - (France)
The People Next Door, starring Eli Wallach and Julie Harris
Perfect Friday, starring Ursula Andress and Stanley Baker
Performance (filmed in 1968), directed by Donald Cammell and Nicolas Roeg, starring James Fox and Mick Jagger - (U.K.)
The Phantom Tollbooth
The Pizza Triangle (Dramma della gelosia), directed by Ettore Scola, starring Marcello Mastroianni and Monica Vitti - (Italy)
The Private Life of Sherlock Holmes, directed by Billy Wilder, starring Robert Stephens, Geneviève Page, Colin Blakely - (U.K.)
Pufnstuf (AKA Pufnstuf Zaps the World) starring Van Snowden and Jack Wild 
Purab Aur Paschim (East and West), starring Ashok Kumar - (India)
Puzzle of a Downfall Child, starring Faye Dunaway

Q
Quackser Fortune Has a Cousin in the Bronx, starring Gene Wilder and Margot Kidder - (Ireland)
¡Qué hacer! (What to Do?) - (Chile)

R
Rabbit, Run, directed by Jack Smight, starring James Caan
The Railway Children, directed by Lionel Jeffries, starring Jenny Agutter - (U.K.)
The Rebel Rousers, starring Jack Nicholson
The Revolutionary, starring Jon Voight
Rio Lobo, directed by Howard Hawks, starring John Wayne, Jorge Rivero, Jennifer O'Neill, Jack Elam, Sherry Lansing
The Rise and Rise of Michael Rimmer, starring Peter Cook, Denholm Elliott, Arthur Lowe - (U.K.)
R. P. M., directed by Stanley Kramer, starring Anthony Quinn and Ann-Margret
Reza Motorcyclist (Reza Motori) (1970) - directed by Masoud Kimiai (Iran)
Ryan's Daughter,  directed by David Lean, starring Robert Mitchum, Sarah Miles, John Mills (Oscar winner) - (U.K.)

S
Salt of the Black Earth (Sól ziemi czarnej) - (Poland)
Scars of Dracula, starring Christopher Lee, Dennis Waterman and Jenny Hanley  - (U.K.)
Scream and Scream Again, starring Vincent Price, Alfred Marks and Christopher Lee- (U.K.)
Scrooge, directed by Ronald Neame, with Albert Finney, Alec Guinness, Edith Evans - (U.K.)
Skullduggery, starring Burt Reynolds and Susan Clark
Soldier Blue, directed by Ralph Nelson, starring Candice Bergen and Peter Strauss
Something for Everyone, directed by Harold Prince, starring Angela Lansbury and Michael York
Space Amoeba, directed by Ishirō Honda - (Japan)
The Spider's Stratagem (Strategia del ragno), directed by Bernardo Bertolucci - (Italy)
Spring and Port Wine, starring James Mason and Susan George - (U.K.)
Start the Revolution Without Me, directed by Bud Yorkin, starring Gene Wilder, Donald Sutherland, Hugh Griffith
Strange Holiday
The Strawberry Statement, starring Bruce Davison, Kim Darby, Bud Cort
Street Scenes, directed by Martin Scorsese (documentary)
 Strogoff
Sunflower (I girasoli), directed by Vittorio De Sica, starring Marcello Mastroianni and Sophia Loren - (Italy)
Suppose They Gave a War and Nobody Came, starring Brian Keith, Don Ameche, Tony Curtis, Suzanne Pleshette
A Swedish Love Story (En kärlekshistoria) - (Sweden)

T
Taking Tiger Mountain by Strategy (Zhi qu wei hu shan) - (China)
Taste the Blood of Dracula, starring Christopher Lee - (U.K.)
Tell Me That You Love Me, Junie Moon, directed by Otto Preminger, starring Liza Minnelli
There's a Girl in My Soup, starring Peter Sellers and Goldie Hawn - (U.K.)
There Was a Crooked Man..., starring Kirk Douglas and Henry Fonda
They Call Me Trinity (Lo chiamavano Trinità), starring Terence Hill and Bud Spencer - (Italy)
The Things of Life (Les choses de la vie) - (France)
Three Sisters, by Laurence Olivier, starring Joan Plowright and Olivier - (U.K.)
...tick...tick...tick..., starring Jim Brown and George Kennedy
Too Late the Hero, directed by Robert Aldrich, starring Michael Caine, Cliff Robertson, Henry Fonda - (U.K./U.S.)
Tora! Tora! Tora!, co-directed by Richard Fleischer and Kinji Fukasaku, starring Martin Balsam and Takahiro Tamura - (U.S./Japan)
Trash, produced by Andy Warhol, directed by Paul Morrissey
The Traveling Executioner, starring Stacy Keach, Bud Cort
Tristana, directed by Luis Buñuel, starring Catherine Deneuve, Fernando Rey, Franco Nero - (Spain/France/Italy)
The Twelve Chairs, directed by Mel Brooks, starring Frank Langella, Ron Moody, Dom DeLuise
Two Mules for Sister Sara, directed by Don Siegel, starring Shirley MacLaine and Clint Eastwood

U
Ucho (The Ear) - (Czechoslovakia)
La última aventura del Zorro
Up in the Cellar, starring Joan Collins and Larry Hagman

V
Valerie and Her Week of Wonders (Valerie a týden divů) - (Czechoslovakia)
The Vampire Lovers, starring Peter Cushing - (U.K.)
Virgo, directed by Mahmoud Zulfikar, starring Salah Zulfikar, Nahed Sherif, Adel Emam - (Egypt)
Vengeance (Bao chou) - (Hong Kong)

W
A Walk in the Spring Rain, starring Anthony Quinn and Ingrid Bergman
The Wandering Swordsman (You xia er), directed by Chang Cheh - (Hong Kong)
Waterloo, directed by Sergei Bondarchuk, starring Rod Steiger, Christopher Plummer, Orson Welles - (U.S.S.R./Italy)
Weekend With the Babysitter starring George E Carey and Susan Romen
Where's Poppa?, directed by Carl Reiner, starring George Segal, Ruth Gordon, Ron Leibman
Which Way to the Front?, directed by and starring Jerry Lewis
White Sun of the Desert (Beloye solntse pustyni) - (USSR)
Whale (Kit), directed by Petar B. Vasilev, starring Georgi Kaloyanchev, Dimitar Panov, Georgi Partsalev - (Bulgaria)
The Window - starring Behrouz Vossoughi and Googoosh - Iran
Why Does Herr R. Run Amok? (Warum läuft Herr R. Amok?), directed by Rainer Werner Fassbinder - (West Germany)
The Wild Child (L'Enfant sauvage), directed by François Truffaut - (France)
Wood Pigeon (Toghi) - directed by Ali Hatami (Iran)
Woodstock, a musical documentary featuring Jimi Hendrix, The Who, Santana and others
WUSA, starring Paul Newman and Joanne Woodward

Z
Zabriskie Point, directed by Michelangelo Antonioni
Zig Zag, starring George Kennedy, Eli Wallach, Anne Jackson

1970 Wide-release movies

January–March
January 1970
Scream and Scream Again
2 January
Jenny
6 January
The Adventures of Gerard
9 January
...tick...tick...tick...
14 January
Last of the Mobile Hot Shots
The Dunwich Horror
16 January
Days and Nights in the Forest (India)
21 January 
The Only Game in Town
Rider on the Rain (France)
25 January 
M*A*S*H
27 January 
Carter's Army
28 January
The Molly Maguires
February 1970 
1 February 
The Kremlin Letter
4 February 
The Honeymoon Killers
Start the Revolution Without Me
5 February 
Patton
9 February
Zabriskie Point
10 February 
End of the Road
The Party at Kitty and Stud's
11 February 
King of the Grizzlies
12 February 
Mumsy, Nanny, Sonny and Girly
19 February 
The Bird with the Crystal Plumage (Italy)
25 February 
Hercules in New York
27 February 
Le Boucher (France)
March 1970
4 March 
Loving
5 March 
Airport
6 March 
Skullduggery
17 March 
The Boys in the Band
18 March 
The Ballad of Cable Hogue
The Liberation of L.B. Jones
20 March
Carry On Up the Jungle (United Kingdom)
21 March
Gamera vs. Jiger (Japan)
24 March
Bloody Mama
King: A Filmed Record... Montgomery to Memphis
25 March
The Adventurers
26 March
Woodstock
27
Young Flying Hero (Taiwan)
31 March
Waterloo

April–June
April 1970
3 April 
Count Dracula (Italy)
4 April 
Gods of the Plague (West Germany)
8 April 
Colossus: The Forbin Project
The Cockeyed Cowboys of Calico County
9 April
Halls of Anger
22 April
Country Dance
26 April
Chariots of the Gods (West Germany)
A Swedish Love Story (Sweden)
27 April
Hi, Mom!
Zig Zag
28 April
A Man Called Horse
29 April
The Confession (France) / (Italy)
May 1970
The Grasshopper
6 May
Equinox
7 May 
Taste the Blood of Dracula
11 May
Leo the Last
Tell Me That You Love Me, Junie Moon
13 May
Connecting Rooms (United Kingdom)
Getting Straight
Let It Be
My Lover, My Son
15 May
The Delta Factor
20 May
Borsalino (France)
The Landlord
One More Time
Suppose They Gave a War and Nobody Came
Too Late the Hero
21 May
Norwood
26 May
Beneath the Planet of the Apes
Cotton Comes to Harlem
The Magic Garden of Stanley Sweetheart
Pufnstuf
27 May 
The Out-of-Towners
Watermelon Man
28 May 
Two Mules for Sister Sara
June 1970
3 June 
The Executioner
4 June
Julius Caesar
The Vampire Doll (Japan)
10 June
Crimes of the Future
The Invincible Six
12 June
The Cheyenne Social Club
15 June
The Strawberry Statement
17 June 
Beyond the Valley of the Dolls
The Hawaiians
On a Clear Day You Can See Forever
A Walk in the Spring Rain
19 June
A Bullet for Pretty Boy
21 June
Catch-22
23 June
Kelly's Heroes
24 June 
Myra Breckinridge
Darling Lili

July–September
July 1970
1 July
The Boatniks
Lost Flight
Ned Kelly (United Kingdom / Australia)
2 July 
Goin' Down the Road
The Moonshine War
4 July 
And Soon the Darkness (United Kingdom)
9 July 
The Games
Which Way to the Front?
12 July 
Hello-Goodbye
13 July
Quackser Fortune Has a Cousin in the Bronx
15 July
Joe
The Revolutionary
16 July
Cromwell (United Kingdom)
18 July
The Man Who Haunted Himself
22 July
Something for Everyone
29 July 
Chisum
31 July 
Move
August 1970
1 August
The Rebel Rousers
Space Amoeba (Japan)
3 August
Ann and Eve (Sweden)
Case for a Rookie Hangman (Czechoslovakia)
Performance
6 August
Goodbye Gemini
10 August
Diary of a Mad Housewife
12 August
Lovers and Other Strangers
Soldier Blue
12 August
WUSA
24 August
House of Dark Shadows
26 August
The Breach (France) / (Italy)
The People Next Door
September 1970
1 September 
Deep End (United Kingdom) / (West Germany)
2 September
Angel Unchained
3 September 
Fragment of Fear
9 September 
Bed and Board (France)
12 September 
Five Easy Pieces
16 September
R. P. M.
17 September 
The Brotherhood of the Bell
21 September 
Crime and Punishment (U.S.S.R)
22 September 
Adam at 6 A.M.
23 September 
Tora! Tora! Tora!

October–December
October 1970
1 October 
The Baby Maker
Cover Me Babe
How Do I Love Thee?
The Traveling Executioner
4 October
Trash
The Vampire Lovers
7 October
Monte Walsh
9 October
The American Soldier (West Germany)
11 October
The Great White Hope
12 October 
The Mind of Mr. Soames
Girls for Mercenaries (Spain)
14 October
C.C. and Company
18 October
I Never Sang for My Father
20 October
Le Cercle Rouge (France)
Rabbit, Run
21 October
Little Fauss and Big Halsy
22 October
The Conformist (Italy) / (France) / (West Germany)
23 October
No Blade of Grass
24 October 
Trog
25 October
When Dinosaurs Ruled the Earth (U.K.)
28 October 
House of Dark Shadows
The Private Life of Sherlock Holmes
The Sidelong Glances of a Pigeon Kicker
The Twelve Chairs
31 October 
Dodes'ka-den (Japan)
November 1970
2 November
Three Sisters
3 November
The Owl and the Pussycat
5 November
Scrooge
7 November
The Phantom Tollbooth
8 November
Scars of Dracula
The Horror of Frankenstein
9 November 
Ryan's Daughter
10 November
Perfect Friday
Where's Poppa?
17 November
The Over-the-Hill Gang Rides Again
18 November
Bartleby (United Kingdom)
Dirty Dingus Magee
I Walk the Line
24 November
The Act of the Heart
December 1970
1 December
Yousuf Khan Sher Bano (Pakistan)
4 December
The Garden of the Finzi-Continis (Italy)
5 December
Brewster McCloud
6 December
Gimme Shelter
8 December
Husbands
11 December 
The Aristocats
Claire's Knee (France)
15 December 
Compañeros (Italy)
There's a Girl in My Soup
The Wild Country
16 December 
Puzzle of a Downfall Child
Love Story
17 December
Alex in Wonderland
Rio Lobo
20 December 
Donkey Skin (France)
21 December 
I Love My Wife
23 December 
Little Big Man
25 December 
There Was a Crooked Man...
31 December 
Loot

Short film series
 The Ant and the Aardvark (1969–71)
 Roland and Rattfink (1968–71)
 Tijuana Toads (1969–72)
 Woody Woodpecker (1941–49, 1951–72)
 Chilly Willy (1955–72)
 The Beary Family (1962–72)

Births
 January 7 - Doug E. Doug, American actor, comedian, screenwriter, producer and director
 January 17 - Genndy Tartakovsky, Russian-American animator, director, producer, screenwriter, voice actor and storyboard artist
 January 19
Essie Davis, Australian actress and singer
Kipp Marcus, American actor, screenwriter and producer
 January 20 – Skeet Ulrich, American actor
 January 21 - Ken Leung, American actor
 January 24 – Matthew Lillard, American actor, voice actor, director and producer
 January 29 - Heather Graham, American actress
 January 31 - Minnie Driver, English actress
 February 3 - Warwick Davis, English actor
 February 14 - Simon Pegg, English actor
 February 18 - Susan Egan, American actress, voice actress, singer and dancer
 February 23 - Niecy Nash, American actress, comedian and television host
 February 25 - Heather Simms, American actress
 March 2 - Alexander Armstrong, English actor, comedian, television personality, television presenter and singer
 March 3 - Julie Bowen, American actress
 March 4
Sergio Basáñez, Mexican actor
Angela V. Shelton, American actress and comedian
 March 5 - Rimantė Valiukaitė, Lithuanian actress
 March 6 - Dan Põldroos, Estonian actor (d. 2007)
 March 7 - Rachel Weisz, English actress
 March 8
Meredith Scott Lynn, American actress, producer and director
Jed Rees, Canadian actor
 March 13 - Tim Story, American filmmaker
 March 18 - Queen Latifah, American actress and rapper
 March 20
Linda Larkin, American actress and voice actress
Michael Rapaport, American actor and comedian
 March 24
Lara Flynn Boyle, American actress and producer
Taizo Harada, Japanese actor and comedian
 March 28 - Vince Vaughn, American actor, writer and producer
 March 31 - Damon Herriman, Australian actor
 April 4 - Barry Pepper, Canadian actor
 April 12 - Retta, American stand-up comedian and actress
 April 13 - Ricky Schroder, American actor
 April 20 - Shemar Moore, American actor
 April 21
Rob Riggle, American actor, comedian, and marine
Nicole Sullivan, American actress, voice artist and comedian
 April 22 - Mireille Soria, American producer
 April 25
Jonathan Brugh, New Zealand comedian, actor and musician
Jason Lee, American actor, comedian, and professional skateboarder
 April 29 - Uma Thurman, American actress
 May 1 - Dave Willis, American actor, writer, animator, producer, and voice actor
 May 3 - Bobby Cannavale, American actor
 May 4 - Will Arnett, Canadian actor
 May 6 - Tristán Ulloa, Spanish actor, writer and director
 May 9 - Helen Hill, American animator (d. 2007)
 May 10 - Dallas Roberts, American actor
 May 12
Samantha Mathis, American actress
Larry Rickles, American screenwriter and producer (d. 2011)
 May 18 - Tina Fey, American actress and comedian
 May 19 - Jason Gray-Stanford, Canadian actor
 May 20 - Sally Phillips, English actress, television presenter and comedian
 May 22
Naomi Campbell, English model and actress
Ayberk Pekcan, Turkish actor (d. 2022)
 May 23 - Nanette Burstein, American director, producer, and screenwriter
 May 25
Jamie Kennedy, American actor, screenwriter, stand-up comedian and television producer
Octavia Spencer, American actress
 May 26 - John Hamburg, American writer and director
 May 27 - Joseph Fiennes, English actor
 May 28 - Glenn Quinn, Irish actor (d. 2002)
 June 1 - Paula Malcomson, North Irish actress
 June 4 - Izabella Scorupco, Polish-Swedish actress and singer
 June 15 - Justin Fletcher, English comedian, children's television presenter
 June 16 - Clifton Collins Jr., American actor
 June 22 - Richard Yearwood, Canadian actor
 June 24 - Andres Raag, Estonian actor
 June 15 - Leah Remini, American actress, author and activist
 June 26
Sean Hayes, American actor and comedian
Chris O'Donnell, American actor
Nick Offerman, American actor, writer, comedian, producer and woodworker
 July 3
Audra McDonald, American actress and singer
Benedict Wong, British actor
 July 4 - Lewis MacLeod, Scottish actor and voice actor
 July 12 - Lee Byung-hun, South Korean actor
 July 14
Mike McFarland, American voice actor
Nina Siemaszko, American actress
 July 16 - Apichatpong Weerasethakul, Thai film director
 July 27 - Nikolaj Coster-Waldau, Danish actor and producer
 July 30 - Christopher Nolan, English-American film director, producer and writer
 August 2 - Kevin Smith, American filmmaker, actor and comedian
 August 4 - Ron Lester, American actor (d. 2016)
 August 6 - M. Night Shyamalan, American film director, writer, producer and actor
 August 9 - Thomas Lennon, American actor, comedian, screenwriter, producer and director
 August 15
Anthony Anderson, American actor
Maddie Corman, American actress
 August 16 
Saif Ali Khan, Indian actor
Kaili Närep, Estonian actress 
 August 17 - Rupert Degas, British-Australian actor
 August 18 - Malcolm-Jamal Warner, American actor
 August 21 - Marc Evan Jackson, American comedian and actor
 August 23 
Jay Mohr, American actor and comedian
River Phoenix, American actor (d. 1993)
 August 24 - Jonathan Ward, American actor
 August 25 - Claudia Schiffer, German model and actress
 August 26 - Melissa McCarthy, American actress, comedian and film producer
 August 31 - Zack Ward, Canadian actor
 September 3 - Maria Bamford, American stand-up comedian, actress and voice actress
 September 4 - Ione Skye, British-born American actress
 September 7
Tom Everett Scott, American actor
Monique Gabriela Curnen, American actress
 September 11 - Taraji P. Henson, American actress
 September 22 - Rupert Penry-Jones, British actor
 September 29 - Emily Lloyd, English actress
 September 30 - Tony Hale, American actor
 October 2
Catherine Kellner, American character actress
Kelly Ripa, American actress and television host
Maribel Verdú, Spanish actress
 October 7 - Nicole Ari Parker, American actress and model
 October 8
Matt Damon, American actor
Anne-Marie Duff, English actress and narrator
 October 12
Cody Cameron, American voice actor and director
Kirk Cameron, American actor
 October 15 - Zak Orth, American actor
 October 18 - Mike Mitchell (director), American director, writer, producer, actor and animator
 October 19 - Chris Kattan, American actor and comedian
 October 22 - Amy Redford, American actress, director and producer
 October 24 - Raul Esparza, American actor
 October 25 - Adam Goldberg, American character actor, filmmaker and musician
 October 26 - Lisa Ryder, Canadian actress
 October 28 - Greg Eagles, American actor, producer and writer
 October 30 - Nia Long, American actress
 October 31
Rob Letterman, American director and screenwriter
Nolan North, American actor and voice actor
 November 1 - Merle Palmiste, Estonian actress
 November 6 - Ethan Hawke, American actor
 November 10 - Vince Vieluf, American actor
 November 12
Aitor Iturrioz, Mexican actor
Craig Parker, New Zealand actor
 November 13 - José María Yazpik, Mexican actor
 November 15 - Danny Sapani, British actor
 November 16 - Martha Plimpton, American actress
 November 18
Mike Epps, American stand-up comedian, producer and actor
Peta Wilson, Australian actress and model
 November 23 - Danny Hoch, American actor, writer and director
 November 24 - Madis Milling, Estonian actor and presenter (d. 2022)
 December 1 - Sarah Silverman, American stand-up comedian, actress, singer and writer
 December 2 - Joe Lo Truglio, American actor, comedian, writer and producer
 December 5 - Adam Levy (actor), British actor
 December 12 
Jennifer Connelly, American actress
Regina Hall, American actress
 December 13 - Bart Johnson, American actor
 December 17 - Sean Patrick Thomas, American actor
 December 23 - Anatole Taubman, Swiss actor
 December 24 - Amaury Nolasco, Puerto Rican actor and producer
 December 28 - Elaine Hendrix, American actress

Deaths
 January 7 - Jack Natteford, 75, American screenwriter, 1,000 Dollars a Minute, Black Bart
 January 19 - Hal March, 49, American actor, Hear Me Good, Send Me No Flowers
 January 23 - Nell Shipman, 77, Canadian actress, writer, producer, Back to God's Country, The Grub-Stake
 January 25 - Eiji Tsuburaya, 68, Japanese film director and special effects designer, Godzilla, Godzilla, King of the Monsters!
 January 27 - Rocco D'Assunta, 65, Italian actor, comedian and playwright 
 February 6 - Roscoe Karns, 76, American actor, It Happened One Night, Alibi Ike
 February 19 - Jules Munshin, 54, American actor, On the Town, Take Me Out to the Ball Game
 February 24 - Conrad Nagel, 72, American actor, All That Heaven Allows, The Divorcee
 March 4 - Peter Godfrey, 70, British director, Christmas in Connecticut, The Two Mrs. Carrolls
 March 6 - William Hopper, 55, American actor, Rebel Without a Cause, Track of the Cat
 March 23 - Del Lord, 75, Canadian pioneer Hollywood director, A Plumbing We Will Go, All the World's a Stooge
 March 25 - Virginia Van Upp, 68, American producer and screenwriter, Gilda, Cover Girl
 March 26 - Patricia Ellis, 51, American actress, A Night at the Ritz, Rhythm in the Clouds
 April 9 - Cobina Wright, 82, American singer and actress, The Razor's Edge, Footlight Serenade
 April 11 - Cathy O'Donnell, 46, American actress, Ben-Hur, The Best Years of Our Lives
 April 18
Gay Seabrook, 69, American actress, Bedtime Worries, Wild Poses
Glenn Tryon, 71, American actor and director, Lonesome, Miss Mink of 1949
 April 19 - George Blair, 64, American director, Duke of Chicago, Streets of San Francisco
 April 21 - Jose Corazon de Jesus Jr., 45, Filipino actor, Garrison 13, Higit Sa Lahat
 April 25 - Anita Louise, 55, American actress, The Little Princess, The Story of Louis Pasteur
 April 26 - Gypsy Rose Lee, 59, American burlesque performer and actress, Screaming Mimi, Belle of the Yukon
 April 28 - Ed Begley, 69, American actor, 12 Angry Men, Patterns
 April 30 - Inger Stevens, 35, Swedish actress, Hang 'Em High, A Guide for the Married Man
 May 10 - Mari Blanchard, 43, American actress, Destry, She-Devil
 May 14 - Billie Burke, 85, American actress, The Wizard of Oz, Father's Little Dividend
 May 17 - Nigel Balchin, 61, British screenwriter, The Man Who Never Was, 23 Paces to Baker Street 
 May 21 - Vinton Hayworth, 63, American actor, playwright, screenwriter, Danger on Wheels, Enemy Agent
 May 22 - Mahmoud Zulfikar, 56, Egyptian director, Aghla Min Hayati, Soft Hands
 May 23 - Nydia Westman, 68, American actress, Ladies Should Listen, Dressed to Thrill
 June 4 - Sonny Tufts, 58, American actor, The Virginian, Government Girl
 June 14 - William Daniels, 68, American cinematographer, Camille, Ninotchka
 July 6 - Marjorie Rambeau, 80, American actress, A Man Called Peter, Tobacco Road
 July 9 - Sigrid Holmquist, 71, Swedish actress, Just Around the Corner, Meddling Women  
 July 14 - Preston Foster, 69, American actor, The Informer, I Am a Fugitive from a Chain Gang
 July 22 - Fritz Kortner, 78, German director, Pandora's Box, The Razor's Edge
 July 24 - Frank Silvera, 55, Jamaican actor, Viva Zapata!, Hombre
 August 1 - Frances Farmer, 56, American actress, Come and Get It, The Toast of New York
 September 3 - Vasil Gendov, 78, Bulgarian film director, actor and screenwriter, Bulgaran is Gallant
 September 11 - Chester Morris, 69, American actor, Meet Boston Blackie, Five Came Back
 September 18 - Jimi Hendrix, 27, American musician, Almost Famous, Wayne's World
 September 29 - Edward Everett Horton, 84, American actor, Arsenic and Old Lace, Top Hat
 October 4 - Janis Joplin, 27, American singer, Watchmen, Three Kings
 October 10 - Grethe Weiser, 67, German actress, My Friend Barbara, Lemke's Widow
 October 17 - Vola Vale, 73, American actress, The Phantom of the Opera
 October 20 - Patrick Wymark, 44, British actor, Battle of Britain, Where Eagles Dare
 October 21 - Ernest Haller, 74, American cinematographer, Gone with the Wind, Mildred Pierce
 November 2 - Fernand Gravey, 64, French actor, The King and the Chorus Girl, The Great Waltz
 November 17 - Naunton Wayne, 69, British actor, Crook's Tour, Dead of Night
 November 25 - Louise Glaum, 82, American actress, Greater Than Love, Sex
 December 2 - Pat Flaherty, 73, American actor, Convict's Code, The Cobra Strikes
 December 12 
Carolyn Craig, 36, American actress, House on Haunted Hill, Portland Exposé
George Terwilliger, 88, American director and screenwriter, The Fatal Hour,  Bride's Play
 December 23 - Charles Ruggles, 84, American actor, Bringing Up Baby, The Parent Trap
 December 30 - Lenore Ulric, 78, American actress, Notorious, Camille
 December 31 - Suzanne Dalbert, 43, French actress, Mark of the Gorilla, The 49th Man

Film debuts 
Jane Alexander - The Great White Hope
Carmen Argenziano - Cover Me Babe
Alan Bennett - Every Home Should Have One
Linda Blair - The Way We Live Now
Brian Blessed - Country Dance
Sean S. Cunningham - The Art of Marriage
Danny DeVito - Dreams of Glass
Paul Dooley - The Out-of-Towners
Robert Downey, Jr. - Pound
Shelley Duvall - Brewster McCloud
Erik Estrada - The Cross and the Switchblade
Scott Glenn - The Baby Maker
Pam Grier - Beyond the Valley of the Dolls
Philip Baker Hall - Cowards
Dan Hedaya - Myra Breckinridge
Peter Jason - Rio Lobo
Don Johnson - The Magic Garden of Stanley Sweetheart
Jeffrey Jones - The Revolutionary
Tommy Lee Jones - Love Story
Diane Keaton - Lovers and Other Strangers
Robert Klein - The Landlord
Frank Langella - Diary of a Mad Housewife
Michael Lerner - Alex in Wonderland
Stephen McHattie - The People Next Door
Anne Meara - The Out-of-Towners
Ornella Muti - The Most Beautiful Wife
Stephen Rea - Cry of the Banshee
Susan Sarandon - Joe
Tom Selleck - Myra Breckinridge
Pepe Serna – The Student Nurses
Paul Sorvino - Where's Poppa?
Sissy Spacek - Trash
Sylvester Stallone - The Party at Kitty and Stud's
Jerry Stiller - Lovers and Other Strangers
Burt Young - Carnival of Blood

References

 
Film by year